The 2021–22 UT Martin Skyhawks men's basketball team represented the University of Tennessee at Martin in the 2021–22 NCAA Division I men's basketball season. The Skyhawks, led by first-year head coach Ryan Ridder, played their home games at Skyhawk Arena in Martin, Tennessee as members of the Ohio Valley Conference. They finished the season 8–22, 4–14 in OVC play to finish in ninth place. They failed to qualify for the OVC Tournament.

Previous season
In a season limited due to the ongoing COVID-19 pandemic, the Skyhawks finished the 2020–21 season 8–16, 11–4 in OVC play to finish in a tie for ninth place. The failed to qualify for the OVC tournament.

On March 12, 2021, interim head coach Montez Robinson announced that the team would not be retaining him as head coach. On March 30, the school announced that Bethune–Cookman head coach Ryan Ridder would be the team's next head coach.

Roster

Schedule and results

|-
!colspan=12 style=| Exhibition

|-
!colspan=12 style=| Non-conference regular season

|-
!colspan=12 style=| Ohio Valley regular season

|-

Sources

References

UT Martin Skyhawks
UT Martin Skyhawks men's basketball seasons
UT Martin Skyhawks men's basketball
UT Martin Skyhawks men's basketball